Maycon Douglas Oliveira Silva (born 27 August 1996), known as Maycon Douglas or simply Maycon, is a Brazilian footballer who plays as a forward for Bahia, on loan from Tombense.

Club career
Born in Nova Friburgo, Rio de Janeiro, Maycon made his senior debut with Friburguense on 28 October 2015, starting in a 0–1 Copa Rio home loss against Angra dos Reis. The following 1 March, he was loaned to Cruzeiro's under-20 squad for the remainder of the year.

On 18 January 2017, Maycon signed a four-year deal with Tombense. After failing to establish himself as a starter, he served loans at Almirante Barroso and ASA before returning to Friburguense on 21 June 2019, also in a temporary deal.

Maycon featured regularly for Tombense during the 2020 campaign, and joined ABC on loan on 11 February 2021. On 23 April, he moved to Série A side Bahia on loan until December.

Career statistics

Honours
Friburguense
Campeonato Carioca Série B1: 2019

References

External links

1996 births
Living people
People from Nova Friburgo
Brazilian footballers
Association football forwards
Campeonato Brasileiro Série A players
Campeonato Brasileiro Série C players
Friburguense Atlético Clube players
Tombense Futebol Clube players
Agremiação Sportiva Arapiraquense players
ABC Futebol Clube players
Esporte Clube Bahia players
Sportspeople from Rio de Janeiro (state)